PP-169 Lahore-XXVI is a Constituency of Provincial Assembly of Punjab.

Bye Elections 2015

General elections 2013

See also
 PP-168 Lahore-XXV
 PP-170 Lahore-XXVII

References

External links
 Election commission Pakistan's official website
 Awazoday.com check result
 Official Website of Government of Punjab

Constituencies of Punjab, Pakistan